The Compass Rose is a 1983 Spanish drama film directed by Patricio Guzmán. It was entered into the 13th Moscow International Film Festival.

Cast
 Patxi Andión as Sr. Haller
 José Antonio Rodríguez
 Nelson Villagra
 Asdrúbal Meléndez
 Gloria Laso as Sra. Haller
 Coca Rudolphy
 Héctor Noguera
 Eliana Vidal
 Fernando Gavidia
 Herbert Gabaldon
 Fernando Birri as Mateo

References

External links
 

1983 films
1983 drama films
Spanish drama films
1980s Spanish-language films
Films directed by Patricio Guzmán
1980s Spanish films